Chidiya  (English: Little bird) is a Bollywood film directed by Mehran Amrohi. The film features Svar Kamble, Ayush Pathak and Vinay Pathak. It is produced by Faqhrul Husaini. Vinay Pathak aka Bali plays a Marathi character in the film. Shailendra Barve created the music.

Plot
The film is the story of two kids aged 9 and 10, their dreams and the flight of their imaginations. Vinay Pathak plays the role of their uncle who helps them to achieve what they want. Amruta Subhash is playing the role of their mother.

Star cast
 Vinay Pathak as Bali
 Amruta Subhash as Vaishnavi
 Inaamulhaq (Cameo)
 Brijendra Kala as Suraj
 Svar Kamble as Shanu
 Ayush Pathak as Bua
 Hetal Gada as Ishani
 Sandeep Pathak as Tapan

Production
Shooting of the film took place in Kamal Amrohi Studio, Mumbai and post production was completed in spring 2016.

Reception
Chidiya was recommended by the NFDC 'Film Bazar'. Chidiya was the official entry in international competition section of prestigious 56th Zlín Film Festival, Czech Republic and was widely appreciated. Chidiya's director Mehran Amrohi won best debutant director award at Dada Sahab Phalke International Film Festival, Delhi. Chidiya was also selected in the official competition section of Kinodiseea International Film Festival, Bucharest, Romania. South Asia International Film Festival, New York, U.S. Kino Kino International Film Festival, Croatia. Spirit of Fire International Film Festival, Russia, Kinoclub International Film Festival, Poland and International Film Festival for Children and Adults, Iran

Awards
Chidiya won many awards in various film festivals.
 Silver Knight Award - Golden Knight International Film Festival, Russia
 Best Film - SMILE International film festival, New Delhi, India
 Second Best Film Award (Golden Elephant) - The 20th International Children's Film Festival, Hyerabad
 Best Debutant Director- South Asia International Film Festival, New York
 Best Debutant Director- Dada Shaeb Phalke International Film Festival, New Delhi

References

External links
 
 

2010s Hindi-language films
Films shot in India
Indian children's films
2016 films